Martin Procházka (born March 1, 1994) is a Czech professional ice hockey player. He is currently playing for VHK Vsetín of the Czech 1.liga.

Procházka made his Czech Extraliga debut playing with HC Sparta Praha during the 2013-14 Czech Extraliga season.

References

External links

1994 births
Living people
HC Bílí Tygři Liberec players
Czech ice hockey forwards
HC Dynamo Pardubice players
Rytíři Kladno players
BK Mladá Boleslav players
HC Plzeň players
HC Slavia Praha players
HC Sparta Praha players
Sportspeople from the Hradec Králové Region